A vibratome is an instrument used to cut thin slices of material (although, usually thicker slices than those cut in paraffin-embedded samples using a microtome). It is similar to a microtome but uses a vibrating blade to cut through tissue.  The vibration amplitude, the speed, and the angle of the blade can all be controlled.  Fixed or fresh tissue pieces are embedded in low gelling temperature agarose. The resulting agarose block containing the tissue piece is then attached to a metal block and sectioned while submerged in a water or buffer bath.  Individual sections are then collected with a fine brush and transferred to slides or multiwell plates for staining.

Vibratome is not a generic name but a registered trademark of Leica Biosystems Richmond, Inc. in the USA.

Advantages  
No need to dehydrate tissues prior to embedding, thus decreased loss of cell constituents
No messy paraffin embedding
Allows for agarose embedding of tissue to provide cutting stability
No need to deparaffinise and rehydrate sections prior to immunostaining
No high temperatures or harsh chemical treatments that may lead to antigen instability
No special microtome blades required
Less chance of artifacts caused by paraffin embedding or freezing
Decreased tissue autofluorescence due to avoidance of formalin-fixation and paraffin embedding
Less wait period from tissue sampling to time of immunolabelling
Allows for direct creation of free-floating sections for immunohistochemistry

Disadvantages  
Instead of ribbons, single sections are cut and collected which are more delicate and difficult to handle.
Sections are generally thicker than those obtained with paraffin methods; penetration of antibodies and other reagents may be slower and thus longer incubation times may be necessary.  Also, thick sections may be difficult to image with the microscope.  (However, thick sections are compatible and sometimes even desirable if using confocal microscopy.)
Securing vibratome sections to glass slides can be difficult or impossible, due to the thickness of the sections.

References 

Histology